Afazuddin Fakir is a Bangladesh Nationalist Party politician and the former Member of Parliament of Tangail-2.

Career
Fakir was the member of the National committee. He had sent a letter to President of Pakistan, Yahya Khan, asking him to deescalate the situation in East Pakistan on 13 March 1971 before the start of Bangladesh Liberation war. He was elected to parliament from Tangail-2 as a Bangladesh Nationalist Party candidate in 1979.

References

Bangladesh Nationalist Party politicians
Living people
2nd Jatiya Sangsad members
Year of birth missing (living people)